The International Festival of the Sahara is an annual festival held in Douz, Tunisia.

History
The festival, called the Camel festival, began in 1910 when Tunisia was under French rule. In 1967 it took on its modern identity according to the will of Habib Bourguiba, Tunisia's first president of the new republic, to become the country's oldest and best-known festival. M'hammed Marzougui, who dedicated his life to make people aware of and appreciate nomadic way of life and traditions, was mainly responsible for the festival's foundation. Since then, every year at the end of December for four days, thousands of people, mostly from all over Tunisia and other Maghrebien countries, flock to Douz.

The festival
After the opening ceremony, the main events take place in the H'naiech stadium in front of the desert surrounded by Bedouin tents. Camel marathons, fantasia- galloping Arab horses ridden by daring riders, a Bedouin marriage, sloughi desert hunting dogs - catching rabbits are the principal features.

In the evening, groups from visiting countries perform songs and dances. The central event is the poetry contest run by the desert poet, Abdellatif Belgacem.

The festival has become an important media and touristic event followed by cameramen and journalists from all over the world.

References

See also
List of festivals in Tunisia

Festivals in Tunisia
Sahara
Winter events in Tunisia